Højen or Gammel Skagen on the west side of Skagen Odde is an old fishing community which now forms part of the town of Skagen in the far north of Jutland, Denmark.

History
The first building in the Skagen area was built in Højen in the 12th century. It belonged to the shepherd Tronder who became the first of Skagen's fishermen. Højen was the largest community on the peninsula until about 1340 when it was overtaken by what is now Skagen's Vesterby. The first documented reference to Højen occurred in the 15th century when it was a fishing hamlet. In 1884, a beacon was installed to guide mariners to the lighthouses on the tip of Skagen Odde. In 1892, a lighthouse was established in Højen itself, functioning until 1956 when it was replaced by Skagen West Lighthouse. It was demolished in 1956.  A life-boat station was opened in Gammel Skagen in 1865. From the end of the 19th century, Højen became popular with tourists. In 1888, Rudolph Jeckel opened Jeckels Hotel and in 1904 today's Ruths Hotel was established by Hans Ruth as Vesterhus. Other small hotels opened later.

Until 2005, Højen was a station on the Skagensbanen, the railway from Frederikshavn to Skagen which opened in 1890.

Over the years, the oldest parts of Højen have been destroyed by coastal erosion while the remaining area has suffered from the effects of drifting sand. There was once a thriving population of around 800 but this was reduced to only 30 a result of these difficulties.

Højen today

Today it maintains the unspoiled appearance of a 19th-century fishing village with many of the old fishermen's cottages. Tourists are attracted by the beaches of Nordstrand on the North Sea. The beach is good for bathing although it can be stony in places. The southern section is popular with naturists.

Højen in art

P.S. Krøyer, one of the Skagen Painters, produced a fine painting of fishermen on the beach at Højen. His "Fishermen hauling nets" (Krøyer fiskere trækker vod) was painted in 1883. In 1909, Laurits Tuxen painted a stormy sea at Højen.

References

Literature

Skagen
Frederikshavn Municipality
Lighthouses in Denmark